Georg Carl Bohlmann   (8 April 1838 – 1920) was a Danish music teacher, music director, organist and composer.

The son of tobacco manufacturers, Bohlmann received his musical training in Bremen, where he stayed from 1851–1859 and was educated under Carl Heinemann. He returned to Copenhagen, where he worked as a music teacher and organizer, and as music director at theaters.

From 1872–1876 he was organist in Svendborg, but then moved back to Copenhagen and resumed his previous activities in particular as a teacher in music theory and instrumentation. He was at times the music director at Odense Teater, the Hotel Marienlyst, and from 1887 at Dagmar Teatret. But he arranged the music of others and also composed a number of major and minor compositions, including 2 symphonies, several overtures, concert pieces for violin and other instruments,

From 1887 he received an annual grant from the state and the Raben-Lewetzauske Fund. From 1892–1920 he was organist at Copenhagen burial services. He died in 1920.

References
This article was initially translated from the Danish Wikipedia.

Danish composers
Male composers
1838 births
1920 deaths
Danish classical organists
Male classical organists